Forto Subregion is a subregion in the Gash-Barka region of western Eritrea. Its capital lies at Forto.

Towns and villages
Algheden

References

Awate.com: Martyr Statistics

Gash-Barka Region
Subregions of Eritrea